This is a list of rivers and wadis in Tunisia. This list is arranged by drainage basin, with respective tributaries indented under each larger stream's name.

North Coast
Oued Zouara
Oued Sejenane
Oued Zitoun
Oued Joumine
Oued Tine
Oued Medjerda
Oued Siliana
Oued Tessa
Oued Mellègue
Oued Sarrath
Oued Miliane
Oued el Hamma

East Coast
Oued el Hadjar
Oued Lebna
Oued Chiba
Oued Nebhana
Oued Zeroud
Oued Merguellil
Oued el Hattab
Oued el Hajel
Oued el Fekka
Oued el Leben

Interior
Oued el Melah
Oeud Sefioune
Oued el Kebir
Oued Jeneien

References
Rand McNally, The New International Atlas,1993.
Defense Mapping Agency, 1981
 GEOnet Names Server

Tunisia
Rivers